Admiral Joseph Bullen (14 April 1761 – 17 July 1857) was an officer of the British Royal Navy who served during the 
American Revolutionary, French Revolutionary and Napoleonic Wars.

Biography
Bullen was the second son of the Reverend John Bullen, Rector of Kennett, Cambridge, and of Rushmoor-cum-Newburn, Suffolk, and entered the Navy in November 1774 as a midshipman, on board the 36-gun frigate , commanded by Captain The Honourable William Cornwallis. He followed Cornwallis into the 50-gun ship , and was present at the Battle of Red Bank and siege of Fort Mifflin, in October and November 1777. Bullen was promoted to lieutenant on 6 March 1778, and shortly afterwards joined the 28-gun , commanded by Captain Horatio Nelson, and was present during the attack on Fort St. Juan during the San Juan Expedition of 1780. He then returned to Lion, under Cornwallis, and was lent to the 90-gun ship , Captain John Williams, and participated as officer in charge of half the middle gun-deck in the Battle of the Saintes on 12 April 1782.

On 6 February 1793, soon after the outbreak of war with France, he was appointed to the 64-gun , Captain Horatio Nelson, and was actively employed in the Mediterranean. For three weeks Bullen commanded "Fort Mulgrave", a battery mounted opposite the town, and on 20 November 1793 was appointed commander of the 20-gun sloop . That vessel being absent at the time, he was appointed acting-captain of the 36-gun frigate , employed as a floating battery. When the British finally evacuated Toulon, Proselyte brought out 300 Spanish and Neapolitan troops.

In March 1794, during the early part of the Siege of Bastia, Bullen served as a volunteer under Captain Walter Serocold, who had superseded him as commander of Proselyte. Towards the end of the operation he commanded an advanced battery. Bullen was invalided out in July 1794, not returning to duty until early 1796, serving first as a volunteer in  under Captain Thomas Byam Martin, and distinguishing himself during the recapture of the Tamise. He then, with the rank of commander, served as captain of the sloop , and as acting-captain of the ship .

Bullen was advanced to the rank of post-captain on 24 November 1796, but was unable to obtain a ship. He served as the commander of the Lyme Regis district of the Sea Fencibles from 26 September 1804 until 1810, when the Corps was disbanded, and afterwards remained on half-pay. He was promoted to rear-admiral on 12 August 1819, to vice-admiral on 12 November 1840, and to admiral on 23 November 1841.

Admiral Bullen died at Bath, Somerset on 17 July 1857.

Personal life
In 1801 he married Margaret Ann, only daughter of W. Seafe of Durham, barrister-at-law.

References

1761 births
1857 deaths
Royal Navy admirals
Royal Navy personnel of the American Revolutionary War
Royal Navy personnel of the French Revolutionary Wars
Royal Navy personnel of the Napoleonic Wars